Skyway Products was a German aircraft manufacturer based in Ettenheim. The company specialized in the design and manufacture of paramotors in the form of ready-to-fly aircraft for the US FAR 103 Ultralight Vehicles rules and the European Fédération Aéronautique Internationale microlight category.

The company seems to have been founded about 2003 and gone out of business late in 2005 and was a subsidiary of Klenhart Graphik, a graphic design concern.

The company was noted for its use of composites to save weight, including in its propellers, engine mounts and integral fuel tanks. It also utilized its own engine design, the Skyway T170.

The company's sole aircraft model was the Skyway Light paramotor.

Aircraft

References

External links
Company website archives on Archive.org

Defunct aircraft manufacturers of Germany
Ultralight aircraft
Paramotors